A list of the films produced in Mexico in 1957 (see 1957 in film):

1957

External links

1957
Films
Mexican